Eois sanguilinea is a moth in the  family Geometridae. It is found on St. George's Island, Bermuda.

References

Moths described in 1895
Eois
Moths of the Caribbean